Harrison Township is one of thirteen townships in Henry County, Indiana, United States. As of the 2010 census, its population was 1,352 and it contained 587 housing units.

Harrison Township was organized in 1838.

History
Henry F. Whitelock House and Farm was added to the National Register of Historic Places in 1983.

Geography
The streams of Bone Run, Cadiz Run, Clear Spring, Down Run, Hendricks Brook, Jakes Branch, Owner Run and Quaker Run run through this township.

Cities and towns
 Cadiz

Adjacent townships
 Fall Creek Township (north)
 Jefferson Township (northeast)
 Henry Township (east)
 Greensboro Township (south)
 Adams Township, Madison County (west)
 Brown Township, Hancock County (west)

Cemeteries
The township contains two cemeteries: Hess, Cadiz Friends, Clear Springs, & Quaker.
Also, there is the Hedrick cemetery located on the Grant City Rd. 1/4 mile south of the CENTRAL AVENUE rd.

Major highways
  Indiana State Road 38
  Indiana State Road 234

References
 
 United States Census Bureau cartographic boundary files

External links
 Indiana Township Association
 United Township Association of Indiana

Townships in Henry County, Indiana
Townships in Indiana